Parvaz may refer to:
Parvaz, Afghanistan
Parvaz, Iran

See also
Parvīz